Ingenuino Dallagio (16 March 1910 – 9 July 1999) was an Italian ski jumper. He competed in the individual event at the 1932 Winter Olympics.

References

External links
 

1910 births
1999 deaths
Italian male ski jumpers
Italian male Nordic combined skiers
Olympic ski jumpers of Italy
Olympic Nordic combined skiers of Italy
Ski jumpers at the 1932 Winter Olympics
Nordic combined skiers at the 1932 Winter Olympics
People from Cortina d'Ampezzo
Sportspeople from the Province of Belluno